Vladimirs Lubkins is retired Latvian ice hockey player (forward). He played most of this career for Dinamo Riga, with brief stints with HC Spartak Moscow and HV Amiens of French league.

References

1953 births
Living people
Dinamo Riga players
Latvian ice hockey forwards
HC Spartak Moscow players
Gothiques d'Amiens players
Soviet ice hockey forwards
Soviet expatriate ice hockey players
Soviet expatriate sportspeople in France
Sportspeople from Perm, Russia
Expatriate ice hockey players in France